Temple Beth Israel, now known as Cutler-Plotkin Jewish Heritage Center, was the first permanent Jewish congregation in the vicinity of Phoenix, Arizona. The building was designed in 1920 by architects Lescher, Kibbey, and Mahoney in the style of a Spanish mission. Although Jewish houses of worship are usually aligned on an east–west axis, the Temple Beth Israel axis is north–south.

The congregation sold the property in 1949 to a Chinese-language Baptist Church, and later the building was occupied by a Spanish-language Baptist Church. In 2002, the property was purchased by the Arizona Jewish Historical Society and named for Rabbi Emeritus Albert Plotkin and donor Lawrence Cutler. After a 2008 restoration, the site was listed on the National Register of Historic Places in 2011 and was listed as one of the Phoenix Points of Pride.

See also
 Congregation Beth Israel (Scottsdale, Arizona)
 National Register of Historic Places listings in Phoenix, Arizona

References

External links
 Arizona Jewish Historical Society

1921 establishments in Arizona
Synagogues completed in 1921
Jewish museums in the United States
Jewish organizations established in 1921
Jews and Judaism in Phoenix, Arizona
Museums in Phoenix, Arizona
National Register of Historic Places in Phoenix, Arizona
Phoenix Points of Pride
Religious buildings and structures in Phoenix, Arizona
Synagogues in Arizona
Synagogues on the National Register of Historic Places in Arizona
Synagogues preserved as museums